Jessica L.P. Weeks is an American political scientist. She is Professor and H. Douglas Weaver Chair in Diplomacy and International Relations in the Department of Political Science at the University of Wisconsin-Madison.

She is known for her work on the intersection of domestic politics and international relations. Her work on audience costs in authoritarian regimes is among the most assigned work in international relations graduate training in United States universities.

She has a PhD in political science from Stanford University (2009), a Master’s degree in international history from the Graduate Institute of International and Development Studies (2003), and a B.A. in political science from Ohio State University (2001). Her doctoral dissertation was titled "Leaders, Foreign Policy, and Accountability in Non-Democracies" and advised by Kenneth Schultz.

Select publications 
 Dictators at War and Peace. 2014. Cornell Studies in Security Affairs, Cornell University Press.
 A number of articles and book chapters — list available on WorldCat

Awards 
 Karl Deutsch Award (2018) — for prominent scholars in international relations under age 40 or within ten years of defending their doctoral dissertation

References 

American political scientists
American women political scientists
International relations scholars
Living people
Year of birth missing (living people)
Stanford University alumni
Graduate Institute of International and Development Studies alumni
21st-century American women